Abigail Williams (born c. 1681) was one of the initial accusers in the Salem witch trials.

Abigail Williams may also refer to:

 Abigail Williams, 2014 recipient of a University of Oxford titles of distinction
 Abigail J. Williams (2003–2017), 2017 murder victim in Delphi, Indiana
 Abigail Williams (band), an American black metal band
 Abigail Williams (As the World Turns), a character on the American TV soap opera As the World Turns
 A character in the video game Fate/Grand Order